London 3 Essex is an English rugby union league that is at the eighth level of the English rugby union system and is available to club sides based in Essex and north-east London.  Promoted teams move up to London 2 North East with league champions going up automatically and the runners up playing a playoff against the runners up from London 3 Eastern Counties, while demoted teams usually drop down to Essex Canterbury Jack 1, with new teams also coming up from this league.  Each year all clubs in the division also take part in the RFU Senior Vase - a level 8 national competition.

The division was created for the 2017-18 as part of an RFU reorganization of the London & South East regional league.  Originally there had been a London 3 North East league which had involved teams from Essex and north-east London along with teams from the Eastern Counties (Cambridgeshire, Norfolk and Suffolk).  Due to the distances involved for teams travelling potentially from London to Norfolk and vice versa, at the end of the 2016–17 season this league was discontinued.  Teams in Essex and north-east London who had played in London 3 North East were transferred into the new look London 3 Essex along with additional promoted teams from the Essex regional leagues, while the Eastern Counties sides went into another new division called London 3 Eastern Counties.

Teams for 2021-22

The teams competing in 2021-22 achieved their places in the league based on performances in 2019–20, the 'previous season' column in the table below refers to that season not 2020–21.

Season 2020–21

On 30 October the RFU announced  that a decision had been taken to cancel Adult Competitive Leagues (National League 1 and below) for the 2020/21 season meaning London 3 Essex was not contested.

Teams for 2019-20

Teams for 2018-19

Teams for 2017-18

London 3 Essex honours

London 3 Essex is a tier 8 league with promotion up to London 2 North East and relegation down to Essex 1.

Promotion play-offs
Since the 2017–18 season there has been a play-off between the runners-up of London 3 Eastern Counties and London 3 Essex for the third and final promotion place to London 3 North East. The team with the superior league record has home advantage in the tie.  At the end of the 2019–20 season the London 3 Eastern Counties have been the most successful with two wins to the London 3 Essex teams none; and the home team has won promotion on two occasions compared to the away teams none.

Number of league titles

Chelmsford (1)
Basildon (1)
Epping Upper Clapton (1)

See also
Essex RFU
English rugby union system
Rugby union in England

Notes

References

8
4
Rugby union in Essex